Rasgetheemu (Dhivehi: ރަސްގެތީމު) the first capital island in the Republic of Maldives located in the north province in the north edge of Maalhosmadhulu Uthuruburi Raa Atoll.

History 
Maldivian legend says that a Sinhalese prince got stranded with his bride - the daughter of the Sri Lankan King in Rasgetheemu, the original 'King's Island'.

Etymology
The name comes from Ras + ge + theemu.  The word Ras means rule or monarchy, ge literally means house, and theemu meaning island. The word Theemu came from Tamil word  Theevu  also meaning island. It probably came from the tamil speakers of chola empire which used to rule northern atolls of Maldives. Theemu appears in the names of other islands, including Agolhitheemu, Utheemu.)  Historians believe that Rasgetheem means "the King’s Town" or "King’s Island".

Geography

Demography

References

External links
 map of Rasgetheemu
 www.rasgetheemu.com

Islands of the Maldives